The 56th North Carolina Infantry Regiment was an infantry regiment that served in the Confederate Army during the American Civil War.

Overview
The North Carolina 56th Infantry Regiment was instituted in July, 1862, at Camp Magnum, North Carolina. The infantry recruitment included counties like, Camden, Cumberland, Pasquotank, Northampton, Orange, Cleveland, Alexander, Rutherford, and Mecklenburg. The regiment was assigned to carry out reconnaissance between Goldsboro, Wilmington, and Tarboro. Later, the unit was stationed at Blackwater. The unit in collaboration with M.W. Ransom's Brigade was involved in battle at several places like Gum Swamp Creek, Plymouth, Drewry's Bluff, Petersburg and Appomattox.

The regiment lost 149 recruits who were taken as prisoners at the battle of Gum Swamp, suffered 4 fatalities and 84 wounded at Plymouth. Loss of lives at Ware Bottom Church numbered 90. The skirmish at Sailor's Creek resulted in many crippled men. Nine officers and 62 infantry reportedly surrendered with the Army of Northern Virginia. The field commander for the unit was Colonel Paul F. Faison. Lieutenant Colonel G. Gratiott Luke and Majors John W. Graham were supporting officers.

Commanders 
 Colonel Paul F. Faison

See also

List of North Carolina Confederate Civil War units
North Carolina in the American Civil War

References 

Units and formations of the Confederate States Army from North Carolina
1862 establishments in North Carolina